"Doctor Doctor" is a song by the British hard rock band UFO, composed by the band's guitarist Michael Schenker at the age of 18; the text is from the singer Phil Mogg. It was released as a single from the album Phenomenon in 1974.

The song did not enter the UK Singles Chart on release, but peaked in Australia at number 97, becoming the group's only charting single in that territory. A live recording from the 1979 album Strangers in the Night was released as a single and became the first top 40 hit for the band. In 2010, a live version with Vinnie Moore was released in the Best of a Decade album.

UFO and Schenker's subsequent band, the Michael Schenker Group, play "Doctor Doctor" live at almost all their concerts. It has been covered by several heavy metal bands, most notably Iron Maiden, who have famously played the song over their PA as the intro to almost all their concerts for decades.

Personnel

 Phil Mogg – vocals
 Andy Parker – drums
 Pete Way – bass
 Michael Schenker – guitar

Chart

References

External links
 Lyrics of this song at genius.com
Doctor Doctor Live Video on Youtube

UFO (band) songs
1974 songs
1979 singles
Chrysalis Records singles